Thomas Warren (by 1513 – 1591), of Dover and Ripple, Kent was an English politician.

He was a Member of Parliament (MP) for Dover in 1547, 1555, 1559, 1563 and 1572.

References

1591 deaths
Members of the Parliament of England for Dover
English MPs 1547–1552
Year of birth uncertain
English MPs 1555
English MPs 1559
English MPs 1563–1567
English MPs 1572–1583
People from Ripple, Kent